GR-113808 is a drug which acts as a potent and selective 5-HT4 serotonin receptor antagonist. It is used in researching the roles of 5-HT4 receptors in various processes, and has been used to test some of the proposed therapeutic effects of selective 5-HT4 agonists, such as for instance blocking the nootropic effects of 5-HT4 agonists, and worsening the respiratory depression produced by opioid analgesic drugs, which appears to be partly 5-HT4 mediated and can be counteracted by certain 5-HT4 agonists.

References

5-HT4 antagonists
Tertiary amines
Piperidines
Indoles
Carboxylic acids
Sulfonamides